Joseph Hadley is an American retired boxer from Jackson, Tennessee, who competed in middleweight division in the 1970s, one of a few trained by Cus D'Amato himself, and also one of the first documented U.S. mixed martial artists. He was selected a member of the All-American AAU boxing team for 1973, and was named the top middleweight amateur boxer in the nation in 1973 by the National AAU Boxing Committee. Hadley drew attention of the press and public by carrying a Bible into the ring, hence his nickname "Preacher," which reflects he actually was a minister. For that reason Hadley refused to pose for a picture with Muhammad Ali, "because Mr. Ali does not live tip to my principles according to the Bible."

Amateur career

Joey Hadley was one of the lesser known boxers D'Amato trained, who fought both in amateur and professional bouts in the 1970s. Hadley was living and training in D'Amato's mansion in Catskill, New York. Hadley took up boxing in 1966 while still living in Tennessee. Hadley won various awards as an amateur boxer, being a six-time Golden Gloves of the Memphis and Mid-South, Three-time Southeastern AAU champion, and United States and North American champion. Fighting for the middleweight at the 1971 National Championships, he won seven fights in nine days, all against regional champions, five by knockouts, knocking down every fighter he faced. Hadley also knocked out future world champ Leon Spinks as an amateur in 1973. He also gained fame in 1976 for having fought one of the earliest mixed martial arts bouts in history against Arkansas Karate champion David Valovich. He used D'Amato's style prominently in these fights.

Highlights

 Mid-South Golden Gloves, novices (147 lbs), Union University Gymnasium, Jackson, Tennessee, February 1967:
1/2: Defeated Joe Graziano by unanimous decision, 5–0
Finals: Defeated Earl Coggin TKO 1 
Tennessee Championships (156 lbs), Fairgrounds Coliseum, Nashville, Tennessee, November–December 1968:
Defeated Bruce Whitehorn 
Defeated Don Morgan
National Golden Gloves (165 lbs), Las Vegas, Nevada, March 1970:
1/8: Defeated Paul Stephens
1/4: Lost to Lamont Lovelady by split decision, 2–3
 National Championships (165 lbs), New Orleans, Louisiana, April–May 1971:
1/32: Defeated n/a KO
1/16: Defeated n/a KO
1/8: Defeated Wilbert Crews by decision
1/4: Defeated n/a KO
1/2: Defeated Vince Fagan 
Finals: Defeated Zachary Page by unanimous decision, 5–0 
 North American Championships (165 lbs), Colonie Coliseum, Latham, New York, May 1971:
Finals: Defeated Jim French (Canada) by split decision, 3–2 
Pan Am Trials (165 lbs), Chicago, Illinois, May 1971:
Lost to Jerry Otis
 Mid-South Golden Gloves (165 lbs), February 1972:

National Golden Gloves (165 lbs), Minneapolis, Minnesota, March 1972:
1/16: Defeated n/a KO
1/8: Defeated n/a KO
1/4: Defeated Robert McAlpine KO 2 
1/2: Lost to Marvin Johnson by decision 
Olympic Trials (165 lbs), Fort Collins, Colorado, June 1972:
Lost to Marvin Johnson
USA–England Duals (165 lbs), Felt Forum, New York City, January 1973:
Lost to Frank Lucas (England) by decision
USA–USSR Duals (165 lbs), Caesars Palace, Las Vegas, Nevada, January 1973:
Lost to Vyacheslav Lemeshev (Soviet Union) TKO 2 
 Midstate Golden Gloves (165 lbs), Nashville, Tennessee, February–March 1973:
n/a
National Golden Gloves (165 lbs), Memorial Auditorium, Lowell, Massachusetts, March 1973:
1/4: Defeated Johnny Johnson KO 1
1/2: Lost to Vonzell Johnson by decision 
Southern Golden Gloves (165 lbs), Nashville, Tennessee, January 1974:
Henry Johnson
National Championships (165 lbs), Knoxville, Tennessee, June 1974:
n/a
International Police Olympics (178 lbs), Nassau Community College, East Garden City, New York, August 1980:
1/4: Lost to Jim Krtinich KO

Professional career
Hadley was a protege of Cus D'Amato, he turned pro under D'Amato's tutelage, D'Amato was in Hadley's corner and was introduced at his pro debut in Pittsfield, Massachusetts. Hadley fought at an undercard of The Rumble in the Jungle. at the same card with other D'Amato's fighter, light heavyweight Bobby Stewart of Amsterdam, New York (who is to be known later as the first trainer of Mike Tyson.)

Professional boxing record

Mixed martial arts record

|-
|Win
|align=center|1–0
| David Valovich
|TKO (punches)
|Mid-South Pro Boxing
|
|align=center|1 (4)
|align=center|1:38
|Memphis Blues Baseball Park—Fairgrounds, Memphis, Tennessee, United States
|Special feature
|}

Retirement and later life
Hadley's career ended after an eye infection while working in New York.

As a former student of D'Amato, Haldey is one of the only boxing coaches to train people in the authentic peek-a-boo style of boxing.

References

External links

Joey Hadley Fights

Living people
Boxers from Tennessee
American male boxers
Year of birth missing (living people)
Middleweight boxers